Mount Desert is a town on Mount Desert Island in Hancock County, Maine, United States.  The population was 2,146 at the 2020 census. Incorporated in 1789, the town currently encompasses the villages of Otter Creek, Seal Harbor, Northeast Harbor, Somesville, Hall Quarry, and Pretty Marsh.

Geography

Demographics

2010 census
As of the census of 2010, there were 2,053 people, 984 households, and 586 families living in the town. The racial makeup of the town was 98.1% White, 0.3% African American, 0.1% Native American, 0.7% Asian, 0.1% from other races, and 0.7% from two or more races. Hispanic or Latino of any race were 0.9% of the population.

There were 984 households, of which 20.9% had children under the age of 18 living with them, 51.0% were married couples living together, 5.7% had a female householder with no husband present, 2.8% had a male householder with no wife present, and 40.4% were non-families. 32.7% of all households were made up of individuals, and 11.8% had someone living alone who was 65 years of age or older. The average household size was 2.09 and the average family size was 2.64.

The median age in the town was 50.7 years. 16.5% of residents were under the age of 18; 5% were between the ages of 18 and 24; 19.2% were from 25 to 44; 37.8% were from 45 to 64; and 21.4% were 65 years of age or older. The gender makeup of the town was 48.2% male and 51.8% female.

2000 census
As of the census of 2000, there were 2,109 people, 962 households, and 583 families living in the town. The racial makeup of the town was 98.62% White, 0.19% African American, 0.09% Native American, 0.09% Asian, 0.14% Pacific Islander, 0.24% from other races, and 0.62% from two or more races. Hispanic or Latino of any race were 0.62% of the population.

There were 962 households, out of which 23.7% had children under the age of 18 living with them, 51.1% were married couples living together, 6.8% had a female householder with no husband present, and 39.3% were non-families. 31.2% of all households were made up of individuals, and 13.0% had someone living alone who was 65 years of age or older.  The average household size was 2.19 and the average family size was 2.76.

In the town, the population was spread out, with 20.6% under the age of 18, 4.2% from 18 to 24, 28.0% from 25 to 44, 29.5% from 45 to 64, and 17.7% who were 65 years of age or older.  The median age was 44 years. For every 100 females, there were 90.2 males.  For every 100 females age 18 and over, there were 85.6 males.

The median income for a household in the town was $41,321, and the median income for a family was $54,375. Males had a median income of $35,189 versus $27,358 for females. The per capita income for the town was $25,709.  About 3.2% of families and 5.1% of the population were below the poverty line, including 4.2% of those under age 18 and 9.3% of those age 65 or over.

Education
Mount Desert is part of the Mount Desert Island Regional School System.

Schools in the district include Mount Desert Island High School, Conners Emerson School, Trenton Elementary School, Pemetic Elementary School, Frenchboro Elementary School, Tremont Consolidated School, Mount Desert Elementary School, Swan's Island Elementary School and 
Islesford Elementary School.

Notable people
 Helen Gilman Noyes Brown (1867-1942), philanthropist
 William Adams Brown (1865-1943), minister, professor and philanthropist

See also
 Acadia National Park
 The Eyrie Summer Home

References

External links
 Mount Desert official web site
 Mount Desert Islander (newspaper)

Mount Desert Island
Towns in Hancock County, Maine
Towns in Maine
1789 establishments in Massachusetts
Populated coastal places in Maine